is a district located in the northern part of Shinjuku, Tokyo, Japan.

Geography 
Kikuichō is bordered by eight other districts of Shinjuku: (clockwise, from the north) Babashitachō, Waseda-tsurumakichō, Waseda-minamichō, Bentenchō, Haramachi-itchōme, Haramachi-nichōme, Wakamatsuchō, and Toyama-itchōme.
It is primarily a residential area. Shops, restaurants and several temples are located along the main thoroughfare, Natsumezaka-dōri.

The closest train stations are Waseda Station (Tokyo Metro) on the Tokyo Metro Tozai Line and Ushigome-yanagichō Station on the Toei Oedo Line.

Land Price 
The average land price in Kikuichō was ¥835,868/m2 as of December 2020. By comparison, the average price across all of Shinjuku was ¥946,124/m2.

Addresses 
Addresses in Kikuichō do not implement the modern  format, and there is no division into .
Instead, the older  system based on lot numbers remains in use.
Due to subdivision, multiple buildings often share the same lot number.

Demographics

Notable Facilities and Places

Education
The Shinjuku City Board of Education operates public elementary and junior high schools. Kikuichō is zoned to Shinjuku Waseda Elementary School (早稲田小学校) and Ushigome Daini (No. 2) Junior High School (新宿区立牛込第二中学校).

History 

Kikuichō was named by Natsume Naokatsu in April 1869.
Natsume Sōseki, his son, wrote about the origin of the name:

Natsume Naokatsu also gave his name to the long slope in the area, Natsumezaka.

Kikuichō was a originally a district of Ushigome-ku. It became part of Shinjuku-ku on March 15, 1947 with the merger of the former wards of Yotsuya-ku, Ushigome-ku, and Yodobashi-ku.

References

External links 
 Ushigome Daini Junior High School (official website)
 Kikuicho Campus, Waseda University (official website)
 Kantsuji Temple (official website)

Neighborhoods of Tokyo
Districts of Shinjuku